Angina pectoris is chest pain due to ischemia (a lack of blood and hence oxygen supply) of the heart muscle

Angina, a medical term generally referring to a constriction, may also refer to:

 Angina animi, a subjective sense that one is dying, which may accompany cardiac ischemia or other conditions
 Abdominal angina, postprandial abdominal pain that occurs in individuals with insufficient blood flow to meet visceral demands
 Ludwig's angina, a serious, potentially life-threatening infection of the tissues of the floor of the mouth
 Prinzmetal's angina, a syndrome typically consisting of cardiac chest pain at rest that occurs in cycles
 Vincent's angina, an infection of the tonsils caused by spirochaeta and treponema
 Angina tonsillaris, an inflammation of the tonsils
 Angina bullosa haemorrhagica, blood blisters in the mucous membranes of the mouth
 Herpangina, pharyngeal blisters caused by Coxsackie A virus or Echovirus